Mitella ovalis is a species of flowering plant in the saxifrage family known by the common names coastal miterwort and oval-leaf miterwort. It is native to western North America from southwestern British Columbia, including Vancouver Island, to northern California as far south as Marin County. It grows in moist, shady habitat, such as coastal forests and streambanks. It is a rhizomatous perennial herb growing up to about 35 or 40 centimeters tall. The leaves occur around the base of the stem. They have oval blades up to 5 centimeters wide with toothed, lobed edges. The erect inflorescence bears several flowers, generally 20 to 60, usually along one side of the stem. The distinctive flower is saucer-shaped with five greenish yellow petals which are divided into narrow, whiskerlike lobes.

External links
Jepson Manual Treatment
Photo gallery

ovalis
Flora of British Columbia
Flora of the West Coast of the United States
Flora without expected TNC conservation status